The Kokoko Iron Range is an elongate trend of iron ore located between Kokoko Lake and Business Lake in Temagami, Ontario, Canada. It consists of an interbedded sequence of chert, jasper and magnetite with a small proportion of hematite.

Unlike the neighbouring Vermilion and Northeast Arm ranges, the Kokoko Iron Range has not been an area of past open-pit mining. It has, however, seen sporadic mineral exploration since at least the early 1950s. This work has identified three possible ore bodies containing more than 25% magnetite. Two of these occur at its western end while the other is situated near the middle of the range.

References

Iron ore deposits
Geology of Temagami
Geologic formations of Ontario